The Karelia Constituency (No.17) is a Russian legislative constituency in the Republic of Karelia. The constituency is the only one in Karelia, and occupies the whole of its territory.

Members elected

Election results

1993

|-
! colspan=2 style="background-color:#E9E9E9;text-align:left;vertical-align:top;" |Candidate
! style="background-color:#E9E9E9;text-align:left;vertical-align:top;" |Party
! style="background-color:#E9E9E9;text-align:right;" |Votes
! style="background-color:#E9E9E9;text-align:right;" |%
|-
|style="background-color:#0085BE"|
|align=left|Ivan Chukhin
|align=left|Choice of Russia
|112,803
|36.98%
|-
|style="background-color:"|
|align=left|Anatoly Anikeyev
|align=left|Independent
| -
|21.20%
|-
| colspan="5" style="background-color:#E9E9E9;"|
|- style="font-weight:bold"
| colspan="3" style="text-align:left;" | Total
| 305,015
| 100%
|-
| colspan="5" style="background-color:#E9E9E9;"|
|- style="font-weight:bold"
| colspan="4" |Source:
|
|}

1995

|-
! colspan=2 style="background-color:#E9E9E9;text-align:left;vertical-align:top;" |Candidate
! style="background-color:#E9E9E9;text-align:left;vertical-align:top;" |Party
! style="background-color:#E9E9E9;text-align:right;" |Votes
! style="background-color:#E9E9E9;text-align:right;" |%
|-
|style="background-color:"|
|align=left|Larisa Zlobina
|align=left|Independent
|101,894
|28.12%
|-
|style="background-color:#23238E"|
|align=left|Natalya Kotsyuba
|align=left|Our Home – Russia
|64,462
|17.79%
|-
|style="background-color:"|
|align=left|Boris Tyukov
|align=left|Communist Party
|48,173
|13.29%
|-
|style="background-color:#3A46CE"|
|align=left|Ivan Chukhin (incumbent)
|align=left|Democratic Choice of Russia – United Democrats
|34,992
|9.66%
|-
|style="background-color:"|
|align=left|Mikhail Maksimov
|align=left|Liberal Democratic Party
|23,321
|6.44%
|-
|style="background-color:"|
|align=left|Anatoly Artemyev
|align=left|Independent
|21,749
|6.00%
|-
|style="background-color:#C28314"|
|align=left|Nikolay Levin
|align=left|For the Motherland!
|13,644
|3.76%
|-
|style="background-color:"|
|align=left|Aleksandr Titov
|align=left|Independent
|7,095
|1.96%
|-
|style="background-color:"|
|align=left|Sergey Romanenko
|align=left|Independent
|2,875
|0.79%
|-
|style="background-color:#000000"|
|colspan=2 |against all
|36,970
|10.20%
|-
| colspan="5" style="background-color:#E9E9E9;"|
|- style="font-weight:bold"
| colspan="3" style="text-align:left;" | Total
| 362,391
| 100%
|-
| colspan="5" style="background-color:#E9E9E9;"|
|- style="font-weight:bold"
| colspan="4" |Source:
|
|}

1999

|-
! colspan=2 style="background-color:#E9E9E9;text-align:left;vertical-align:top;" |Candidate
! style="background-color:#E9E9E9;text-align:left;vertical-align:top;" |Party
! style="background-color:#E9E9E9;text-align:right;" |Votes
! style="background-color:#E9E9E9;text-align:right;" |%
|-
|style="background-color:"|
|align=left|Valentina Pivnenko
|align=left|Independent
|106,371
|30.46%
|-
|style="background-color:"|
|align=left|Aleksandr Chazhengin
|align=left|Yabloko
|47,045
|13.47%
|-
|style="background-color:#1042A5"|
|align=left|Artur Myaki
|align=left|Union of Right Forces
|45,818
|13.12%
|-
|style="background-color:"|
|align=left|Boris Tyukov
|align=left|Communist Party
|42,489
|12.17%
|-
|style="background-color:#020266"|
|align=left|Larisa Zlobina (incumbent)
|align=left|Russian Socialist Party
|27,767
|7.95%
|-
|style="background-color:"|
|align=left|Mikhail Maksimov
|align=left|Liberal Democratic Party
|21,580
|6.18%
|-
|style="background-color:#FCCA19"|
|align=left|Mikhail Mrykhin
|align=left|Congress of Russian Communities-Yury Boldyrev Movement
|6,661
|1.91%
|-
|style="background-color:#000000"|
|colspan=2 |against all
|44,582
|12.77%
|-
| colspan="5" style="background-color:#E9E9E9;"|
|- style="font-weight:bold"
| colspan="3" style="text-align:left;" | Total
| 349,224
| 100%
|-
| colspan="5" style="background-color:#E9E9E9;"|
|- style="font-weight:bold"
| colspan="4" |Source:
|
|}

2003

|-
! colspan=2 style="background-color:#E9E9E9;text-align:left;vertical-align:top;" |Candidate
! style="background-color:#E9E9E9;text-align:left;vertical-align:top;" |Party
! style="background-color:#E9E9E9;text-align:right;" |Votes
! style="background-color:#E9E9E9;text-align:right;" |%
|-
|style="background-color:"|
|align=left|Valentina Pivnenko (incumbent)
|align=left|United Russia
|150,521
|50.44%
|-
|style="background-color:"|
|align=left|Irina Petelyayeva
|align=left|Yabloko
|52,198
|17.49%
|-
|style="background-color:#1042A5"|
|align=left|Artur Myaki
|align=left|Union of Right Forces
|30,589
|10.25%
|-
|style="background-color:"|
|align=left|Boris Tyukov
|align=left|Communist Party
|17,911
|6.00%
|-
|style="background-color:"|
|align=left|Aleksey Belyaninov
|align=left|Independent
|8,399
|2.81%
|-
|style="background-color:#164C8C"|
|align=left|Viktor Potiyevsky
|align=left|United Russian Party Rus'
|2,312
|0.77%
|-
|style="background-color:#7C73CC"|
|align=left|Vladimir Shilik
|align=left|Great Russia–Eurasian Union
|1,972
|0.66%
|-
|style="background-color:#00A1FF"|
|align=left|Vladimir Liminchuk
|align=left|Party of Russia's Rebirth-Russian Party of Life
|1,947
|0.65%
|-
|style="background-color:#000000"|
|colspan=2 |against all
|28,723
|9.62%
|-
| colspan="5" style="background-color:#E9E9E9;"|
|- style="font-weight:bold"
| colspan="3" style="text-align:left;" | Total
| 298,683
| 100%
|-
| colspan="5" style="background-color:#E9E9E9;"|
|- style="font-weight:bold"
| colspan="4" |Source:
|
|}

2016

|-
! colspan=2 style="background-color:#E9E9E9;text-align:left;vertical-align:top;" |Candidate
! style="background-color:#E9E9E9;text-align:left;vertical-align:top;" |Party
! style="background-color:#E9E9E9;text-align:right;" |Votes
! style="background-color:#E9E9E9;text-align:right;" |%
|-
|style="background-color:"|
|align=left|Valentina Pivnenko
|align=left|United Russia
|77,653
|36.56%
|-
|style="background-color:"|
|align=left|Irina Petelyayeva
|align=left|A Just Russia
|37,118
|17.48%
|-
|style="background-color:"|
|align=left|Boris Kashin
|align=left|Communist Party
|24,369
|11.47%
|-
|style="background-color:"|
|align=left|Timur Zornyakov
|align=left|Liberal Democratic Party
|21,776
|10.25%
|-
|style="background-color:"|
|align=left|Natalia Kiselene
|align=left|Yabloko
|18,983
|8.94%
|-
|style="background-color:"|
|align=left|Nikolay Tarakanov
|align=left|Rodina
|5,009
|2.36%
|-
|style="background-color:"|
|align=left|Yelena Gnyotova
|align=left|Party of Growth
|4,996
|2.35%
|-
|style="background-color: "|
|align=left|Igor Prokhorov
|align=left|Patriots of Russia
|4,572
|2.15%
|-
|style="background:"| 
|align=left|Mikhail Bynkov
|align=left|The Greens
|3,883
|1.83%
|-
|style="background:"| 
|align=left|Aleksey Malevanny
|align=left|Civic Platform
|2,338
|1.10%
|-
| colspan="5" style="background-color:#E9E9E9;"|
|- style="font-weight:bold"
| colspan="3" style="text-align:left;" | Total
| 212,376
| 100%
|-
| colspan="5" style="background-color:#E9E9E9;"|
|- style="font-weight:bold"
| colspan="4" |Source:
|
|}

2021

|-
! colspan=2 style="background-color:#E9E9E9;text-align:left;vertical-align:top;" |Candidate
! style="background-color:#E9E9E9;text-align:left;vertical-align:top;" |Party
! style="background-color:#E9E9E9;text-align:right;" |Votes
! style="background-color:#E9E9E9;text-align:right;" |%
|-
|style="background-color: " |
|align=left|Valentina Pivnenko (incumbent)
|align=left|United Russia
|55,677
|27.69%
|-
|style="background-color: " |
|align=left|Emilia Slabunova
|align=left|Yabloko
|29,751
|14.79%
|-
|style="background-color: " |
|align=left|Yevgeny Ulyanov
|align=left|Communist Party
|26,368
|13.11%
|-
|style="background-color: " |
|align=left|Viktor Stepanov
|align=left|A Just Russia — For Truth
|25,858
|12.86%
|-
|style="background-color: " |
|align=left|Aleksandr Chazhengin
|align=left|Party of Pensioners
|12,947
|6.44%
|-
|style="background-color: " |
|align=left|Aleksandr Pakkuyev
|align=left|Liberal Democratic Party
|10,555
|5.25%
|-
|style="background-color: "|
|align=left|Vladimir Kvanin
|align=left|New People
|10,122
|5.03%
|-
|style="background-color:"|
|align=left|Anna Pozdnyakova
|align=left|Party of Growth
|8,956
|4.45%
|-
|style="background-color: "|
|align=left|Denis Bazankov
|align=left|Russian Party of Freedom and Justice
|7,951
|3.95%
|-
|style="background-color: "|
|align=left|Ivan Kadayas
|align=left|Rodina
|2,105
|1.05%
|-
| colspan="5" style="background-color:#E9E9E9;"|
|- style="font-weight:bold"
| colspan="3" style="text-align:left;" | Total
| 201,105
| 100%
|-
| colspan="5" style="background-color:#E9E9E9;"|
|- style="font-weight:bold"
| colspan="4" |Source:
|
|}

Notes

Sources
17. Карельский одномандатный избирательный округ

References

Russian legislative constituencies
Politics of the Republic of Karelia